Stewart James Barrowclough (born 29 October 1951) is an English footballer who played as a winger, notably for Newcastle United throughout the 1970s. He scored 48 goals from 424 appearances in the Football League.

A skilful and dynamic winger, Barrowclough began his career with his hometown club Barnsley and his performances from a handful of first-team appearances caught the eye of clubs in higher divisions. He joined Newcastle United in 1970, scoring on his debut against Burnley and became a key player down the wing for much of the decade. Whilst at Newcastle he picked up
a League Cup losers medal following the Magpies 2-1 Wembley defeat to Manchester City. Barrowclough later played for Birmingham City and Bristol Rovers before returning to Barnsley, where he contributed to the club's early 80s resurgence. He finished his League career with Mansfield Town. He represented England at under-23 level.

His son Carl Barrowclough was also a professional footballer.

References

1951 births
Living people
Footballers from Barnsley
English footballers
England under-23 international footballers
Association football wingers
Barnsley F.C. players
Newcastle United F.C. players
Birmingham City F.C. players
Bristol Rovers F.C. players
Mansfield Town F.C. players
English Football League players